The External Security Organisation (ESO) is a government agency, mandated to collect, analyse and process information related to external security threats with the objective of informing national policy makers in Uganda. Its headquarters are located in a three-story office building that the agency owns on Hannington Road, on Nakasero Hill, in Kampala, Uganda's capital and largest city.

Overview
ESO was established by an Act of Parliament, the Security Organisations Act 1987. The agency focuses on the assessment of external security threats to Uganda. In the 2014/2015 financial year, the agency was allocated a budget of UGX:14 billion. Sometimes ESO's activities overlap with those of other government spy agencies, including the Internal Security Organisation and the Chieftaincy of Military Intelligence.

Administration
The Director-general serves as the chief executive of the government agency. She or he is appointed by the President of Uganda and reports directly to the president and to any other person or entity approved by the president. The Director-general has directors under her/his supervision, who report directly to her/him. The current director-general is Joseph Ocwet, a former career diplomat.

See also
Internal Security Organisation
Government of Uganda

References

External links
 Government disowns ESO chief over dual citizenship

Government agencies of Uganda
Intelligence agencies
Government agencies established in 1987
1987 establishments in Uganda
Organisations based in Kampala